William C. Coleman (July 6, 1878 – ?) was a house painter and trade union activist from Milwaukee, Wisconsin who served two terms as a Socialist member of the Wisconsin State Assembly.

Background 
Coleman was born July 6, 1878 on a farm at Sioux City, Iowa, where his parents (father from Theresa in Dodge County; mother from Byron 
in Fond du Lac County) had settled in 1877. During the year his parents returned to Wisconsin, due to a grasshopper plague and Indian disturbances, settling on a farm in Fond du Lac County, where he was educated in the public schools. He moved to Milwaukee in 1899, and became a house painter by trade, and an active member of the Brotherhood of Painters, Decorators and Paperhangers Union of America. He worked as a union organizer for the Painters' Union, the Milwaukee Federated Trades Council and the Wisconsin State Federation of Labor, and rose to be a member of the executive boards of the Council and the Federation.

Politics 
In 1908, Coleman came within nine votes of unseating incumbent Republican State Representative Herman Georgi. In 1920, Coleman was the Socialist candidate for governor, coming in third in a four-way race and receiving 71,104 votes, the highest vote ever cast for a Socialist candidate for that office to that date.

When elected to the Assembly in 1924, he had already been an Alderman-at-Large on the Milwaukee Common Council, and was serving as state secretary and organizer of the Socialist Party of Wisconsin. In 1924, he succeeded fellow Socialist Albert F. Woller in the Twentieth Milwaukee County Assembly district (the 20th ward of the City of Milwaukee), defeating former State Representative Republican Charles Meising (whom Woller had unseated in 1922), 4,232 to 3,492. He was assigned to the standing committee on labor.

In 1926, Coleman was re-elected with 3327 votes to 2679 for Meising and 2763 for Democrat Gustin Schwarn.

Coleman did not run for re-election in 1928, and was succeeded by Republican Norman R. Klug.

References 

Members of the Wisconsin State Assembly
Milwaukee Common Council members
House painters
American builders
1878 births
Year of death missing
Socialist Party of America politicians from Wisconsin
Politicians from Milwaukee
Politicians from Sioux City, Iowa
Wisconsin State Federation of Labor people
American trade union leaders